Bendiksen is a surname. Notable people with the surname include:

Arne Bendiksen (1926–2009), Norwegian singer
Jonas Bendiksen (born 1977), Norwegian photojournalist
Rolf Bendiksen (born 1938), Norwegian politician
Thomas Kind Bendiksen (born 1989), Norwegian footballer